The solo discography of Lisa contains 9 studio albums, 2 compilation albums, 2 extended plays and 33 singles.

Studio albums

Collaborative albums

Compilation albums

Extended plays

Singles

As lead artist

As featured artist

Promotional singles

Video albums

Guest appearances
The following songs are not singles or promotional singles and have not appeared on an album by Lisa.

Notes

References

Discographies of Japanese artists
Pop music discographies
Rhythm and blues discographies
Electronic music discographies